The  is a railway line in Miyagi Prefecture, Japan, owned and operated by the East Japan Railway Company (JR East). It connects Aoba-dōri Station in Sendai to Ishinomaki Station in Ishinomaki, and provides access to the central coast areas of Miyagi Prefecture, significantly the Matsushima area. It connects with the Sendai Subway Nanboku Line at Aoba-dōri Station; the Tōhoku Shinkansen, the Tōhoku Main Line and the Senzan Line at Sendai Station; and the Ishinomaki Line in Ishinomaki. The name Senseki (仙石) comes from the combination of the first kanji of Sendai (仙台) and Ishinomaki (石巻), the two cities that the Senseki Line connects. It is also the only line in Sendai area that is powered by DC overhead power line.

Basic data
Operators, distances:
East Japan Railway Company (Services and tracks)
Aoba-dōri — Ishinomaki: 50.2 km / 31.2 mi.
Japan Freight Railway Company (Services and tracks)
Rikuzen-Yamashita — Ishinomaki-Minato: 1.8 km / 1.1 mi.
Japan Freight Railway Company (Services)
Rikuzen-Yamashita — Ishinomaki: 1.4 km / 0.9 mi.
Stations:
Passenger stations: 31
Freight terminals: 1 (Ishinomaki-Minato)
Tracks:
Double-track: Aoba-dōri — Higashi-Shiogama
Single-track: Higashi-Shiogama — Ishinomaki
Electrification: Whole line (1,500 V DC)
Railway signalling:
Aoba-dōri — Higashi-shiogama:ATACS(≈ETCS Level 3)
Higasi-Shiogama —Ishinomaki: ATS-Ps
CTC center: Miyagino Operation Control Center

Services

Local trains and rapid service trains that ran the entire length of the line operated at 30-minute intervals. When the line was fully recovered in 2015, rapid services were switched to the route via the Senseki-Tōhoku Line. Therefore, under the 2015 timetable, the section between Aoba-dōri and Takagimachi is served only by local trains.

The segment from Aoba-dōri to Higashi-Shiogama is a key part of Sendai's transportation system, and becomes very crowded during peak periods, and headways are as short as 4 minutes. During non-peak times 3–5 trains run per hour. Between Higashi-Shiogama and Ishinomaki two trains run per hour.

In addition to all-stations "local" trains, there are limited-stop "rapid" and "special rapid" services on the Senseki Line section between Takagimachi and Ishinomaki. Between Sendai and Takagimachi, the "rapid" and "special rapid" services operate on the Senseki-Tōhoku Line.

A "Mangattan Train" operates on the Senseki Line, with a livery featuring Ishinomori Manga characters.

Disaster and reconstruction, 2011–2015 
Service was halted since the 2011 Tōhoku earthquake and tsunami, as several trains, stations, and sections of the line were destroyed, heavily damaged, or flooded. Service for the first 16 miles of the line from Sendai was expected to be restored by the end of May 2011. By mid-July, the Sendai – Matsushima-Kaigan and Yamoto – Ishinomaki sections had service restored, although the latter segment was with diesel trains due to the loss of the power substation. The remainder of the line between Matsushima-Kaigan and Yamoto was obliterated by the tsunami.

Costing approximately 2 billion yen to build, the new link allows through-running services from the Tohoku Main Line to the Senseki Line, and cut approximately 10 minutes off the journey time between Sendai and Ishinomaki. On 26 March 2016, a new station located between Rikuzen-Akai Station and Hebita Station, called Ishinomakiayumino Station was opened.

Stations

The distances shown above are as of May 30, 2015 following the rerouting of the section between Rikuzen-Ōtsuka and Rikuzen-Ono, by which the section was shortened by 1.2 kilometers.

Rolling stock
 205-3100 series 4-car EMUs
 HB-E210 series 2-car hybrid DMUs

Former Rolling Stock
 72 series (Since 1974)
 79 series (Since 1974)
 103 series (1979-2004, 2006-2009)
 105 series (March 1987 – 1998)

History

The Miyagi Electric Railway opened the line in sections between 1925 and 1928. Individual opening dates are given in the timeline section below. The Rikuzen-Haranomachi to Nishi-Shiogama section was double-tracked between 1968 and 1969, and extended to Higashi-Shiogama in 1981.

In 2000, the surface section between Rikuzen-Haranomachi and Sendai was replaced by a double-track underground line, with a new section to Aoba-dori to connect to the Sendai subway.

Parts of the line were extensively damaged by the 2011 Tohoku earthquake and tsunami, and whilst service was restored on the majority of the line by March 2012, the Takagimachi – Rikuzen-Ono section was returned to service on 30 May 2015.

Timeline 
 5 June 1925: Miyagi Electric Railway (later Senseki Line): Sendai – Nishi-Shiogama.
 1 January 1926: Miyaginohara Station opens.
 14 April 1926: Nishi-Shiogama – Hon-Shiogama section opens.
 18 April 1927: Hon-Shiogama – Matsushima-Kōen (later Matsushima-Kaigan Station) section opens.
 10 April 1928: Matsushima-Kōen – Rikuzen-Ono section opens.
 15 May 1928: Nigatake Station opens.
 22 November 1928: Rikuzen-Ono – Ishinomaki section opens, connecting Sendai to Ishinomaki.
 1 June 1929: Kazuma Station opens.
 23 October 1931: Nobiru Station becomes Tōhoku-Suma Station.
 1 December 1931: Tōna Station opens.
 8 January 1932: Ishinomaki station becomes Miyaden-Ishinomaki Station.
 1 August 1932: Geba Station opens.
 1 February 1939: Miyaden-Yamashita Station (later Rikuzen-Yamashita Station) opens.
 7 November 1939: Miyaden-Yamashita – Kama (later Ishinomaki Port Station) freight connection opens.
 1 May 1944: Miyagi Electric Railway is nationalized, becomes the Senseki Line; Higashi-Nanabanchō Station becomes Sendai Higashi-Guchi Station, Hamada Station becomes Rikuzen-Hamada Station, Matsushima-Kōen becomes Matsushima-Kaigan Station, Tomiyama becomes Rikuzen-Tomiyama Station, Ōtsuka becomes Rikuzen-Ōtsuka Station, Tōhoku-Suma becomes Nobiru Station, and Miyaden-Ishinomaki becomes Ishinomaki Station.
 1 June 1952: Sendai – Sendai Higashi-Guchi section stops operation.
 26 September 1952: Sendai – Sendai Higashi-Gushi section abolished.
 1957: Rapid trains begin operation.
 23 February 1968: Track doubled on Fukudamachi – Tagajō section.
 19 March 1968: Track doubled on Rikuzen-Haranomachi – Fukudamachi section.
 11 October 1968: Kama – Ishinomaki-Futō freight connection opens
 26 September 1969: Track doubled on Tagajō to Nishi-Shiogama section.
 1 April 1971: Kama – Ishinomaki-Minato freight connection abolished.
 15 March 1972: Kama Station becomes Ishinomaki-Minato Station.
 1974: 72 series and 79 series trains begin operation.
 1 October 1979: 103 series trains begin operation.
 1 April 1981: Nakanosakae Station opens.
 1 November 1981:  Nishi-Shiogama – Higashi-Shiogama section elevated, double-tracked; Hon-Shiogama Station and Higashi-Shiogama Station moved.
 2 October 1983: New weekend schedule introduced.
 31 March 1987: Higashi-Yamoto Station opens.
 1 April 1987: Senseki Line becomes part of the East Japan Railway Company (JR East).
 13 March 1988: Rapid trains renamed Umikaze; scheduling changes.
 21 July 1990: Ishinomaki and Senseki Lines' Ishinomaki stations are merged.
 1 November 1999: Ishinomaki-Minato – Ishinomaki-Futō; freight connection abolished.

 11 March 2000: Sendai – Rikuzen-Haranomachi section moved underground; Aoba-dōri – Sendai section added.
 5 November 2002: 205-3100 series trains begin operation.
 July 2004: Last remaining 103 series trains withdrawn.
 13 March 2004: Kozurushinden Station opens.
 16 October 2004: "Umikaze" name is discontinued; weekday and Saturday schedules are merged.
 16 March 2005: Nishi-Shiogama Station becomes unmanned.
 November 2006: One 4-car 103 series train is brought out of storage and reinstated into service.
 21 October 2009: JR East's last remaining 103 series train is withdrawn from service.
 11 March 2011: Two Senseki Line trains were derailed and badly damaged by the 2011 Tōhoku earthquake and tsunami.
 2015: Services are restored over the entire length of the line.
 26 March 2016: Ishinomakiayumino Station opens.

References

 
Lines of East Japan Railway Company
Railway lines opened in 1925
1925 establishments in Japan
1067 mm gauge railways in Japan
Rail transport in Miyagi Prefecture